Paravietnura, is a genus of Springtails belonging to the family Neanuridae. The genus contains 2 species restricted to Russia.

Body with blue pigmented. Body tubercles well developed. Two pigmented eyes found on each side of head. Mouth parts reduced.

Species
 Paravietnura notabilis Smolis & Kuznetsova, 2018 
 Paravietnura insolita Smolis & Kuznetsova, 2018

References

Arthropod genera
Neanuridae